Omar Jesús Saint Andre Clemente (born 14 June 1996) is a Mexican footballer who plays as a midfielder for Ocelotes UNACH.

References

1996 births
Living people
Mexican footballers
Association football midfielders
Altamira F.C. players
Cafetaleros de Chiapas footballers
Ocelotes UNACH footballers
Cocodrilos de Tabasco footballers
Ascenso MX players
Liga Premier de México players
Sportspeople from Tampico, Tamaulipas
Footballers from Tamaulipas